West Virginia's 7th Senate district is one of 17 districts in the West Virginia Senate. It is currently represented by Republican Mike Stuart and Republican Rupie Phillips. All districts in the West Virginia Senate elect two members to staggered four-year terms.

Geography
District 7 is based in Southern West Virginia, covering all of Boone, Lincoln, and Logan Counties and parts of Mingo and Wayne Counties. Communities in the district include Wayne, Lavalette, Hamlin, Alum Creek, Madison, Logan, Chapmanville, Mallory, Mount Gay-Shamrock, and Gilbert Creek.

The district is located entirely within West Virginia's 3rd congressional district, and overlaps with the 16th, 19th, 20th, 21st, 22nd, 23rd, and 24th districts of the West Virginia House of Delegates.

Recent election results

2022

Historical election results

2020

2018

2016

2014

2012

Federal and statewide results in District 7

References

7
Boone County, West Virginia
Lincoln County, West Virginia
Logan County, West Virginia
Mingo County, West Virginia
Wayne County, West Virginia